John Aitken Allan (18 August 1897 – 31 August 1979) was born in Wellington, Wellington, New Zealand on 18 August 1897 and was a New Zealand presbyterian minister and professor of theology.

References

1897 births
1979 deaths
New Zealand academics
New Zealand theologians
Victoria University of Wellington alumni